Liolaemus kingii, King's tree iguana, is a species of lizard in the family Iguanidae.  It is found in Chile and Argentina. It lives in shrubland, sandbanks, and coastal hills, having a mostly insectivorous diet. It is a viviparous species, meaning it gives birth to live young.

References

kingii
Lizards of South America
Reptiles of Argentina
Reptiles of Chile
Reptiles described in 1843
Taxa named by Thomas Bell (zoologist)